The Centre Ice Arena, also called The Centre, is a 700-seat, 49,000 square-foot facility built in 2002. It is located on the Delaware State Fairgrounds in Harrington, Delaware. The facility holds an ice rink and hosts ice hockey, figure skating and public skating in the winter, and then hosts the 4-H and FFA exhibits and demonstrations during the Delaware State Fair in the summer.

Ice hockey

The Salisbury University Gulls club ice hockey team play home games at the Centre. The Federal Prospects Hockey League's Delaware Thunder have also called the building home since the fall of 2019.

Figure skating
The Bay Country Figure Skating Club's skaters perform shows and practice at the Centre.

References

Indoor ice hockey venues in the United States
2002 establishments in Delaware